Omar Chaaban Khaled Bugiel (born 3 January 1994), known as Omar Bugiel, is a professional footballer who plays as a striker for  club Sutton United and Lebanon.

Bugiel began his senior career in England at Selsey in 2011. After a season, he moved to Burgess Hill Town, before moving back to Selsey in 2013. Bugiel then played for Bognor Regis Town in 2013–14, and Worthing—with whom he scored over 50 goals—between 2014 and 2017. In February 2017 Bugiel joined National League side Forest Green Rovers, helping them to EFL League Two promotion. After a season in the English fourth tier, Bugiel moved to Bromley—first on loan, then on a permanent deal—before joining Sutton United, helping them also gain promotion to League Two.

Born in Germany, Bugiel obtained Lebanese citizenship through his father in order to represent their national team. He made his international debut in 2017, and played in the final round of the 2022 FIFA World Cup qualification.

Early life 
Bugiel was born in Berlin, Germany, to Lebanese father Khaled and a Polish mother Ewa. He holds dual German-Lebanese citizenship, and obtained a Lebanese passport in 2017.

Having initially began playing cageball, Bugiel moved to Munich aged 11, and joined the youth team of 1860 Munich; he was released by the club in 2009. He moved to England the following year aged 16 with the aim of learning English, and enrolled at Chichester College in Sussex.

Bugiel was tutored by one of Paul Hinshelwood's sons—also named Paul—who noticed Bugiel's football skills while playing five-a-side at the college. Bugiel lodged at Hinshelwood's house for two and a half years; he was part of the youth team at Chichester City, before joining Selsey, coached by another one of Hinshelwood's sons (Adam).

Club career

Early career
Bugiel played for Selsey between 2011 and 2013, including a one-year stint at Burgess Hill Town in 2012–13, before transferring to Bognor Regis Town.

In 2014, he moved Worthing, also coached by Adam Hinshelwood. He had prolific goalscoring form over four years at the Rebels, scoring 45 league goals in 103 appearances, and hitting double figures in each of his last three seasons.

Forest Green Rovers 

Bugiel was signed by Forest Green Rovers in February 2017 for an undisclosed fee. Bugiel scored a goal and made an assist on his debut on 11 February, in a 2–0 win over Boreham Wood. He was part of the Forest Green side that were victorious in the National League play-offs at the end of the season, helping them to promotion to the EFL League Two. He made his English Football League debut against Barnet on 5 August 2017, becoming the first Lebanese international to do so.

Bromley 
On 4 January 2018, Bugiel joined National League side Bromley on loan for the remainder of the campaign. He scored in Bromley's 2017–18 FA Trophy final defeat to Brackley Town in Wembley. Bugiel was released by Forest Green at the end of the 2017–18 season. On 1 July 2018, it was announced that Bugiel signed for Bromley on a two-year contract.

Sutton United

2019–20 season 
On 3 June 2019, Sutton United announced the signing of Bugiel. He scored his first National League goal for the club on 26 October 2019, in a 3–2 home defeat to Ebbsfleet United. In December 2019, Bugiel scored in both the first round and the replay of the 2019–20 FA Trophy matches against Dagenham & Redbrige, with his team however failing to qualify to the next round. On 21 December 2019, Bugiel scored a hat-trick in the league against Wrexham in a 3–1 home win.

The next matchday, on Boxing Day, he scored a brace against Woking in a 2–0 home win in the league, with his first goal being a 25-yard volley in the first minute. The goal was voted winner of the 2020 Vanarama National League World Cup of Goals on Twitter. Bugiel scored seven goals in the last four matches in all competitions. He ended the season with seven goals in 30 league games—10 in 34 in all competitions.

2020–21 season 
Bugiel scored his first goal of the 2020–21 season on 3 October 2020, against Maidenhead United, in a 3–0 win in the first matchday. His first assist of the season came on 27 October, helping his side win 2–1 away from home to Yeovil Town. Bugiel scored in two consecutive matchdays, on 17 and 21 November, against Dagenham & Redbridge and Wealdstone respectively. He scored five league goals in 37 games, and helped Sutton United finish first in the National League, gaining promotion to the EFL League Two.

2021–present
On the opening day of the 2021–22 EFL League Two season, Bugiel scored Sutton's first-ever Football League goal, a header against his former-side Forest Green to level the scores; the match eventually ended in a 2–1 defeat.

On 30 July 2022, Bugiel scored in the first matchday of the 2022–23 EFL League Two, in a 1–1 draw against Newport County; he scored on the opening day of the season for Sutton in all four seasons at the club.

International career

Eligible to play for the Lebanon national team through his father, Bugiel was spotted by Lebanon manager Miodrag Radulović following his goalscoring form at Forest Green. He got his Lebanese passport in 2017 to represent the national team.

Bugiel was first called up in May 2017 for an AFC Asian Cup qualifier against Malaysia, but did not feature in the 2–1 win. Bugiel was called up again for the next qualifier in North Korea on 5 September 2017.

He made his debut for Lebanon on 9 November 2017, coming on as a substitute in a 1–0 victory over Singapore. Bugiel's first goal also came as a substitute, scoring the lone goal in a friendly against Jordan on 6 September 2018.

Personal life 
Bugiel's uncle, is a Lebanese-born German actor. Bugiel and his wife, Lauren, have two children.

Career statistics

Club

International

Scores and results list Lebanon's goal tally first, score column indicates score after each Bugiel goal.

Honours
Forest Green Rovers
 National League play-offs: 2016

Bromley
 FA Trophy runner-up: 2017–18

Sutton United
 National League: 2020–21
 EFL Trophy runner-up: 2021–22

Individual
 Vanarama National League World Cup of Goals: 2020

See also
 List of Lebanon international footballers born outside Lebanon

Notes

References

External links

 
 
 
 

1996 births
Living people
Footballers from Berlin
Lebanese footballers
German footballers
Lebanese people of Polish descent
German people of Lebanese descent
German people of Polish descent
Citizens of Lebanon through descent
Association football forwards
TSV 1860 Munich players
Chichester City F.C. players
Selsey F.C. players
Burgess Hill Town F.C. players
Bognor Regis Town F.C. players
Worthing F.C. players
Forest Green Rovers F.C. players
Bromley F.C. players
Sutton United F.C. players
Isthmian League players
National League (English football) players
English Football League players
Lebanon international footballers
Lebanese expatriate footballers
Lebanese expatriate sportspeople in England
German expatriate footballers
German expatriate sportspeople in England
Expatriate footballers in England